Van Cutsem is a Dutch-language surname originating in Flemish Brabant:

Bernard van Cutsem (1916–75), English racehorse breeder and trainer
Henri Van Cutsem (1839–1904), Belgian patron of the arts
Hugh van Cutsem (1941–2013), English banker, landowner and horse breeder
Louis Van Cutsem (1909–1992), Belgian sculptor
Margaret van Cutsem, otherwise Lady Margaret Fortescue (1923–2013), English landowner and huntswoman
William van Cutsem, known as William Vance (1935–2018), Belgian comics artist
William van Cutsem (b. 1979), godfather of Prince George of Wales

References

Dutch-language surnames